Tsutsui no Jōmyō Meishū (筒井浄妙明秀) was a warrior monk (sōhei) from Mii-dera who fought alongside Minamoto no Yorimasa and his fellow monks at the Battle of Uji in 1180, defending the Byōdō-in and Prince Mochihito from the Taira clan.

Later, in the same account, Gochi-in no Tajima is replaced on the bridge by his comrade, Tsutsui. Standing upon the broken bridge of Uji, Kyoto, Tsutsui fought off the Taira samurai with bow and arrow, naginata, sword, and dagger.

According to The Tale of the Heike:

References

Turnbull, Stephen. Japanese Warrior Monks AD 949–1603. Oxford: Osprey Publishing, 2003.

Japanese warrior monks
Heian period Buddhist clergy
People of Heian-period Japan